Jundala Forest Park is a forest park in the Gambia. Established on January 1, 1954, it covers 437 hectares.

It has an elevation of 54 metres. The Park is situated east of Sun Kunda.

References
  
 

Protected areas established in 1954
Forest parks of the Gambia